Barbados competed in the 2015 Parapan American Games.

Competitors
The following table lists Bermuda's delegation per sport and gender.

Medalists
The following competitors from Bermuda won medals at the games. In the by discipline sections below, medalists' names are bolded.

|  style="text-align:left; width:78%; vertical-align:top;"|

|  style="text-align:left; width:22%; vertical-align:top;"|

Athletics

Women

Boccia

See also
Bermuda at the 2015 Pan American Games

References

2015 in Bermudian sport
Nations at the 2015 Parapan American Games
Bermuda at the Pan American Games